Echinosepala stonei is a species of orchid plant native to Costa Rica.

References

stonei
Flora of Costa Rica